Jacques Van Reysschoot (2 May 1905 – 1975) was a Belgian ice hockey player. He won a silver medal at the Ice Hockey European Championship 1927, and finished fifth at the 1928 Winter Olympics.

References

1905 births
1975 deaths
Ice hockey players at the 1928 Winter Olympics
Olympic ice hockey players of Belgium
Sportspeople from Ghent